Kupamanduka/ Kupamanduka-nyaya (कूपमण्डूक) is a Sanskrit language expression, meaning "frog in a well".. In Sanskrit, Kupa means a well and Manduka means a frog. The phrase is used for a small-minded person who foolishly imagines the limits of his knowledge to form the limit of all human knowledge (much as a frog might imagine the well in which it lived to be the largest body of water possible, being completely unable to conceive of anything as vast as an ocean). Equally, if such a frog looked up from its well, and saw but a small circle of sky, it might imagine this tiny disc to be the entirety of the heavens, unaware of the existence of other beings existing beyond the walls of the well and  able to see the whole sky bounded by the true horizon. 

Amartya Sen opines that its meaning carries a caution in opposition to insularity. Kupamanduka denotes a propensity to bigotry and intolerance and the inability to be positive, or paranoia. Mohammad Bakri Musa likens it to the Malay language phrase katak di bawah tempurong (frogs under a coconut shell). The story of the Koopamanduka is often told to children in India and forms a part of many folktales. A similar idiom (chengyu), :zh:井底之蛙, is also used in Chinese folklore.

Examples of usage
 "But due to the acute paucity of scientific psychological publications in India, we often suffer the disadvantages of a kupa manduka (frog in the well) existence."
 "Arrogance and infinite faith in their own wisdom are attributes of the kupa manduka,..."
 "I think it is not that we see ourselves as a kind of flourishing Kupamanduka, a well-frog confined to a little well but a culture, a civilization, a people that has soared in the world, interacted with the world and not been afraid of interaction."

See also
 Frogs in culture

References

Sanskrit words and phrases